Pierre Lepautre or Le Pautre (1652 – 16 November 1716) was a French draughtsman, engraver and architect, especially known as an ornemaniste, a prolific designer of ornament that presages the coming Rococo style. He was the son of the designer and engraver Jean Lepautre and nephew of the architect Antoine Lepautre. His appointment in 1699 as Dessinateur in the Bâtiments du Roi, the official design department of the French monarchy, headed by Jules Hardouin-Mansart and later Robert de Cotte in the declining years of Louis XIV, was signalled by the historian of the Rococo, Fiske Kimball, as a starting point in the genesis of the new style.

Notes

Bibliography
 Dee, Elaine Evans (1982). "Lepautre, Pierre", vol. 2, pp. 687–688, in Macmillan Encyclopedia of Architects, edited by Adolf K. Placzek. London: Collier Macmillan. .
 Dee, Elaine Evans; Berger, Robert W.; Moureyre, Françoise de la (1996). "Le Pautre [Le Paultre; Lepautre]", vol. 19, pp. 210–213, in The Dictionary of Art, edited by Jane Turner. London: Macmillan. . Also at Oxford Art Online (subscription required).
 Kalnein, Wend von (1995). Architecture in France in the Eighteenth Century, translated by David Britt. New Haven: Yale University Press. .
 Kimball, Fiske (1943). The Creation of the Rococo. Philadelphia: Philadelphia Museum of Art. .  (1980 Dover reprint as The Creation of the Rococo Decorative Style).
 Préaud, Maxime (2008). Inventaire du fonds français. Graveurs du XVIIe siècle. Tome 13. Pierre Lepautre. Paris: Bibliothèque nationale de France. .
 Souchal, François (1981). French Sculptors of the 17th and 18th centuries. Volume 2: The reign of Louis XIV. Illustrated Catalogue G–L. Oxford: Cassirer. .

17th-century French engravers
French designers
1648 births
1716 deaths
Artists from Paris
18th-century French engravers